Wiesław Perszke (born February 18, 1960 in Jabłonowo Pomorskie, Kuyavian-Pomeranian) is a former long-distance runner from Poland, who represented his native country at the 1992 Summer Olympics in Barcelona, Spain. He set his personal best (2:11:15) in the classic distance in 1993].

Achievements
All results regarding marathon, unless stated otherwise

References
 sports-reference

1960 births
Living people
Polish male long-distance runners
Athletes (track and field) at the 1992 Summer Olympics
Olympic athletes of Poland
People from Brodnica County
Sportspeople from Kuyavian-Pomeranian Voivodeship